Devours is the stage name of Jeff Cancade, a Canadian electronic musician.

Originally from Nanaimo, British Columbia, Cancade launched the project after moving to Vancouver, British Columbia and coming out as gay. He released his debut mixtape Dignity in 2013, before following up with the full-length mixtape 21st & Main in 2014.

He then released his first official EP Avalon in 2015, and debut full-length album Late Bloomer on April 15, 2016 via the independent label Locksley Tapes.

In 2018, he signed to Artoffact Records, releasing his second album Iconoclast on that label in March 2019. The album was preceded by the advance single "Curmudgeon", and supported with a regional tour of British Columbia and the Pacific Northwest region of the United States.

His music has been described as "a pseudo-goth, synth-heavy electronic project that occupies a uniquely experimental, queer niche in Vancouver" by The Globe and Mail. Outside of Devours, Cancade has also composed music for television and film.

Discography
Dignity (2013)
21st & Main (2014)
Avalon (2015)
Late Bloomer (2016)

References

External links

Canadian electronic musicians
Canadian film score composers
Musicians from British Columbia
People from Nanaimo
Canadian gay musicians
Living people
Canadian television composers
Year of birth missing (living people)
21st-century Canadian LGBT people